Elisa Beni Uzabal (born 31 July 1965) is a Spanish journalist.

Biography
Elisa Beni graduated in Information Sciences from the University of Navarra. She has worked at La Voz de Almería, La Razón, Época magazine, and was editor-in-chief of the now-defunct newspaper Diario 16.

In 2001 she married for the second time, to judge , magistrate of the Audiencia Nacional. They divorced in April 2014.

In June 2014 she published a novel, Peaje de libertad.

In June 2022 she won the “Charo’s Champions League organized by the Twitter user Niggflix.

Selected publications
 Levantando el velo. Manual de periodismo judicial (2006) CIE Inversiones Editoriales Dossat-2000, S.L.,  – with Javier Gómez Bermúdez
 La soledad del juzgador (2007) Editorial Planeta, 
 Peaje de libertad (2014) Espasa, 
 La Justicia sometida (2015) Los Libros de la Catarata, 
 Pisa mi corazón (2017) Editorial Almuzara,

References

External links
 

1965 births
20th-century Spanish women writers
21st-century Spanish novelists
21st-century Spanish women writers
Living people
People from Logroño
Spanish newspaper editors
Spanish women journalists
Spanish women novelists
University of Navarra alumni
Women newspaper editors
Diario 16 people